Jack Edwards  (1876 – 1939) was a Welsh international footballer. He was part of the Wales national football team, playing 1 match on 19 February 1898 against Ireland. At club level, he played for Aberystwyth Town.

See also
 List of Wales international footballers (alphabetical)

References

External links
 

1876 births
1939 deaths
Place of birth missing
Date of death missing
Welsh footballers
Wales international footballers
Aberystwyth Town F.C. players
Association football midfielders